"Don't Kill the Magic" is a song recorded by Canadian reggae fusion band Magic! from their debut studio album of the same name (2014). It was written by group members Nasri Atweh and Mark Pellizzer along with the producer, Adam Messinger. Released on April 4, 2014 as the album's second single in select territories including New Zealand and Australia, it was not released in the United States due to "Rude" enjoying prolonged popularity and continuing to rise on the charts there.

Music video
The official video for "Don't Kill the Magic" premiered April 23, 2014 and features the band performing in a dark room lit by pulsating lamps set up in the form of a giant capital 'M'.

Chart performance

Weekly charts

Year-end charts

Release history

References

2014 songs
2014 singles
Magic! songs
RCA Records singles
Sony Music singles
Songs written by Nasri (musician)
Songs written by Adam Messinger
Songs written by Mark "Pelli" Pellizzer